NOS Alive is a music and arts festival that takes place in Algés, in the municipality of Oeiras, Portugal, since 2007.

Oeiras Alive! 07 
The first edition of the festival was held between 8 and 10 June 2007. The main attraction were the return of Pearl Jam, Linkin Park and The Smashing Pumpkins to Portugal, and the first time for bands like The Used, The White Stripes and Beastie Boys.

Optimus Alive! 08 
The second edition was held between 10 and 12 July 2008. It was the first to have Optimus as the main sponsor. The second edition gained considerable international attention having both Bob Dylan and Neil Young in the line up.

Optimus Alive! 09 

The third edition was held between 9 and 11 July 2009. It is the only edition to have had a day dedicated to heavy metal music in the main stage.

Optimus Alive! 10 
The fourth edition was held between 8 and 10 July 2010.

Optimus Alive '11 
The fifth edition took place between 6 and 9 July 2011. To celebrate the fifth anniversary of the festival, a fourth day was added on Wednesday (6 July), in which Coldplay were the headliners.

Optimus Alive '12 
The sixth edition of the festival was held between 13 and 15 July 2012. It drew crowds of more than 55,000 people and featured The Stone Roses, The Cure and Radiohead as headliners,

Optimus Alive '12 was nominated for several European Festival Awards - Best Major Festival, Best European Festival Line-up and Artists' Favourite Festival - but did not win in any category.

Optimus Alive '13 

The seventh edition of the festival took place between 12 and 14 July 2013.

NOS Alive '14 
In 2014 the festival was re-branded as NOS Alive. The eight edition of the festival took place between 10 and 12 July 2014.

NOS Alive '15 

NOS Alive '15 was the ninth edition of the festival and took place between 9 and 11 July 2015.

NOS Alive '16 
NOS Alive '16 was the tenth edition of the festival and took place between 7 and 9 July 2016.

NOS Alive '17 
NOS Alive '17 was the tenth edition of the festival and took place between 7 and 9 July 2017.

NOS Alive '18 
NOS Alive '18 was the 11th edition of the festival and took place between 12 and 14 July 2018.

The Kooks had to cancel their show the day prior to the event, due to Luke Pritchard, the band's lead singer, still being affected by bronchitis. They were replaced by Blossoms, who had played in the previous edition of the festival.

NOS Alive '19 
NOS Alive '19 was the 12th edition of the festival and took place between 11 and 13 July 2019.

NOS Alive '20 (cancelled) 
The 2020 edition of NOS Alive was scheduled to take place between 8 and 11 July 2020. On 19 May 2020, the festival was cancelled due to the Portuguese government's decision to prohibit all large-scale events in the country until 30 September 2020, amid the COVID-19 pandemic. The planned lineup for that year's edition was the following:

NOS Alive '21 (cancelled) 
After the cancellation of the previous edition, NOS Alive '21 was scheduled to take place on the 7th, 8th, 9th and 10 July 2021, with all previous bought tickets valid for the new dates or refunded. In early May 2021, Everything is New's CEO, Álvaro Covões, expressed his doubts regarding the execution of the festival that year due to the COVID-19 pandemic. The edition was eventually cancelled on 20 May 2021, with all previously bought tickets valid for NOS Alive '22.

Before the cancellation, the planned lineup was the following:

NOS Alive '22 
On 20 May 2021, after the cancellation of that year's edition, the dates for NOS Alive '22 were publicly released: 6, 7, 8 and 9 July 2022.

References 

Music festivals in Portugal